Zaragoza-Goya is an underground railway station opened on April 3, 2012 in the Spanish city of Zaragoza, Aragon. It serves as the main city centre station for Cercanías Zaragoza lines C-1 from Casetas to Miraflores, and some regional services. It is the only railway station in Zaragoza which interchanges with the Zaragoza tram.

History
The station opened on April 3, 2012, with regular service beginning the following day. The total building cost was €44.5 million.

Services 

Zaragoza-Goya is primarily served by the Cercanías Zaragoza commuter rail line, with a frequency of every 60 minutes. Regional services to Logroño and Canfranc via Huesca also call at Goya.

References

Railway stations in Spain opened in 2012
Buildings and structures in Zaragoza
Railway stations located underground
Railway stations located underground in Spain